10,000 km is a Spanish romantic drama film directed by Carlos Marqués-Marcet. It film stars Natalia Tena and David Verdaguer as a couple trying to make their relationship work, while one lives in Barcelona and the other in Los Angeles.

The film had its world premiere on March 10, 2014 at the SXSW film festival and received the Special Jury Recognition for Best Acting Duo. The film was released on May 16, 2014 in Spain and on July 10, 2015, in a limited release and through video on demand by Broad Green Pictures in the United States.

Plot
10,000 km follows the relationship between Alexandra and Sergi in Barcelona, Spain. They struggle to find a balance between their plans of having a baby and Alex's photography career. When Alex accepts a one-year residency in Los Angeles, their distance apart tests the bounds of their relationship. They attempt to use modern technology to keep their relationship strong, but the physical distance proves more challenging than they could have imagined.

Cast
 Natalia Tena as Alex
 David Verdaguer as Sergi

Release
The film had its world premiere at the SXSW film festival on March 10, 2014. The film also screened at the AFI festival on November 7, 2014. The film was acquired by Broad Green Pictures for U.S domestic distribution. The film was released in a limited release and through video on demand on July 10, 2015.

Awards

References

External links

2014 romantic drama films
2014 films
2010s Spanish-language films
Broad Green Pictures films
Spanish romantic drama films
Films directed by Carlos Marques-Marcet